Ferisco Devon Adams (born 12 July 1989) is a South African cricketer who currently plays for Boland. He is a right-handed batter and right-arm fast-medium bowler. Adams made his first-class debut on 1 March 2012 against Gauteng. He was included in the Boland cricket team squad for the 2015 Africa T20 Cup.

In June 2018, he was named in the squad for the Cape Cobras team for the 2018–19 season. In September 2018, he was named in Boland's squad for the 2018 Africa T20 Cup. In October 2018, he was named in Cape Town Blitz's squad for the first edition of the Mzansi Super League T20 tournament. He was the leading run-scorer for Boland in the 2018–19 CSA Provincial One-Day Challenge, with 269 runs in eight matches.

In September 2019, he was named in the squad for the Paarl Rocks team for the 2019 Mzansi Super League tournament. Later the same month, he was named in Boland's squad for the 2019–20 CSA Provincial T20 Cup. In April 2021, he was named in Boland's squad, ahead of the 2021–22 cricket season in South Africa.

References

External links
 

1989 births
Living people
People from Robertson, Western Cape
Cricketers from the Western Cape
South African cricketers
Boland cricketers
Cape Cobras cricketers
Cape Town Blitz cricketers
Knights cricketers
Paarl Rocks cricketers
Paarl Royals cricketers